The Major League Baseball All-Time Team was chosen in 1997 to comprise the top manager and top player in each of 13 positional categories across Major League Baseball history.  The team, announced by Classic Sports Network in conjunction with the events celebrated around the 1997 Major League Baseball All-Star Game, were chosen by a panel of 36 members of the Baseball Writers' Association of America in a first- and second-place Borda count voting system.

See also
Latino Legends Team
MLB All-Century Team
DHL Hometown Heroes (2006): the most outstanding player in the history of each MLB franchise, based on on-field performance, leadership quality and character value
Baseball awards#United States
Team of the century
List of MLB awards
National Baseball Hall of Fame and Museum

Notes

References	
Brown, Gerry, and Morrison, Michael (eds.; 2003).  ESPN Information Please Sports Almanac.  New York City: ESPN Books and Hyperion (joint).  .

All-Time Team
1997 Major League Baseball season
All-time Team
Awards established in 1997